Udayam is a 1973 Indian Malayalam film, directed by P. Bhaskaran. The film stars Madhu, Sharada, Adoor Bhasi and Prem Prakash in the lead roles. The film had musical score by V. Dakshinamoorthy.

Cast

Madhu as Rajasekharan
Sharada as Geetha (dubbed by KPAC Lalitha)
Adoor Bhasi as Ready Krishnapillai
Prem Prakash as Unni
Sankaradi as Raman Pillai
Shobha as Young Geetha
T. R. Omana as Lakshmikkuttiyamma
Raghavan as Mohandas/Dasappan
T. S. Muthaiah as Vasu Pillai
Adoor Bhavani as Bhavaniyamma
Amba
Bahadoor as Ittiyavira
C. K. Aravindakshan
K. V. Mathew as Sadanandan
Master Vijayakumar as Young Rajasekharan
P. K. Nambiar
P. O. Thomas as Thomas
Philomina as Ikkavamma
Radhamani as Vanaja
Raghava Menon as Chakkochan
Ramankutty Menon as Narayana Pillai
Rani Chandra as Hema
Thodupuzha Radhakrishnan as Uthuppu
Vanchiyoor Radha
Madhuri as Dancer
Bhaskaran Nair
Pala Thankam
T. K. Balachandran

Soundtrack
The music was composed by V. Dakshinamoorthy and the lyrics were written by P. Bhaskaran and Sreekumaran Thampi.

References

External links
 

1973 films
1970s Malayalam-language films
Films directed by P. Bhaskaran